Jared McGee is an American football player at Northwestern University at the linebacker position. He hails from Mansfield, Texas, and is a graduate of Mansfield Legacy High School. Although he is not a starter he is a heavy contributor on both defense and special teams for the Wildcats.

References 

Northwestern Wildcats football players
Living people
Year of birth missing (living people)